Attack of the 50 Foot Woman is a 1958 independently made American science fiction horror film directed by Nathan H. Juran (credited as Nathan Hertz) and starring Allison Hayes, William Hudson and Yvette Vickers. It was produced by Bernard Woolner. The screenplay was written by Mark Hanna, and the original music score was composed by Ronald Stein. The film was distributed in the United States by Allied Artists as a double feature with War of the Satellites.

The Allied Artists television version runs 75 minutes instead of 66, including a long printed crawl at the beginning and end, repeated sequences, and hold-frames designed to optically lengthen the film's running time.

The film's storyline concerns the plight of a wealthy heiress whose close encounter with an enormous alien in his round spacecraft causes her to grow into a giantess, complicating her marriage which is already troubled by a philandering husband.

Attack of the 50 Foot Woman is a variation on other 1950s science fiction films that featured size-changing humans: The Amazing Colossal Man (1957), its sequel War of the Colossal Beast (1958), and The Incredible Shrinking Man (1957); in this case, a woman is the protagonist.

Plot
A television announcer reports sightings of a red fireball around the world. Facetiously, he calculates its path will take it to California. Nancy Archer (Allison Hayes), a wealthy but highly troubled woman with a history of emotional instability and immoderate drinking, is driving on a road that night in an American desert. A glowing sphere settles on the deserted highway in front of her, causing her to veer off the road. When she gets out to investigate the object, a huge creature exits and reaches for her.

Nancy escapes and runs back to town, but nobody believes her story due to her known drinking problem and a recent stay in a mental institution. Her philandering husband, Harry Archer (William Hudson), is more interested in his latest girlfriend, town floozy Honey Parker (Yvette Vickers). He pretends to be the good husband in the hope that Nancy will "snap" and return to the "booby hatch," leaving him in control of her $50 million estate.

Nancy bargains with Harry, asking him to search the desert with her for the "flying satellite," agreeing to a voluntary return to the sanatorium if they find nothing. As night falls, they find the spacecraft and the alien creature emerges, revealed as an enormous male human. Harry fires his pistol at the giant, but the gunfire has no effect. Harry flees, leaving Nancy behind.

She is later discovered on the roof of her pool house in a delirious state and must be sedated by her family physician, Dr. Cushing (Roy Gordon). The doctor comments on scratches he finds on Nancy's neck, and theorizes that she was exposed to radiation. Egged on by his mistress Honey, Harry plans to inject Nancy with a lethal dose of her sedative, but when he sneaks up to her room, he discovers that she has grown to giant size. In a scene paralleling Nancy's first alien encounter, only an enormous hand is seen as Harry reacts in horror.

Cushing and Dr. Von Loeb, a specialist brought in by Cushing, are at a loss on how to treat their giant patient. They keep her in a morphine-induced coma and restrain her with chains while waiting for the authorities to arrive. The sheriff and Jess (Ken Terrell), Nancy's faithful butler, track enormous footprints leading away from the estate to the alien sphere. Inside the sphere, they find Nancy's diamond necklace (containing the largest diamond in the world) and other large diamonds, each in a clear orb. They speculate that the jewels are being used as a power source for the alien ship. The huge human reappears, and the sheriff and Jess flee.

Meanwhile, Nancy awakens and breaks free of her restraints. She tears off her mansion's roof and, clothed in a bikini-like arrangement of bed linens, heads to town to avenge herself on her unfaithful husband. Ripping the roof off the local bar, she spots Honey and drops a ceiling beam on her rival, killing her. Harry panics, grabs Deputy Charlie's pistol, and begins shooting, but she picks up Harry and walks away. The gunshots have no apparent effect on her. The sheriff fires a shotgun at her, which causes a nearby power line transformer to blow up, killing her. The doctors find Harry lying dead in her hand.

Cast
 Allison Hayes as Nancy Fowler Archer
 William Hudson as Harry Archer
 Yvette Vickers as Honey Parker
 Roy Gordon as Dr. Isaac Cushing
 George Douglas as Sheriff Dubbitt
 Ken Terrell as Jess Stout, Nancy's butler
 Otto Waldis as Dr. Heinrich Von Loeb
 Eileen Stevens as nurse
 Frank Chase as Deputy Charlie
 Michael Ross as Tony the bartender/the giant alien

Critical reception

On review aggregator website Rotten Tomatoes, the film has an approval rating of 69% based on 13 reviews, with an average rating of 6.1/10.

Remakes and sequels
 
With its low budget of around $88,000, Attack of the 50 Foot Woman made enough money to prompt discussion of a sequel. According to executive producer and cinematographer Jacques Marquette, the sequel was to be produced at a higher budget and in color. A script was written, but the project never advanced beyond the discussion phase.

In early 1979, Dimension Pictures announced that producer Steve Krantz was developing a 5-million-dollar remake with director Paul Morrissey. It never came to fruition.

In the mid-1980s, filmmaker Jim Wynorski considered doing a remake with Sybil Danning in the title role. Wynorski made it as far as shooting a photo session with Danning dressed as the 50-foot woman. The project never materialized because Wynorski opted instead to film Not of This Earth (1988), a remake of Roger Corman's 1957 film of the same name.

The film was remade in 1993 by HBO under the same title Attack of the 50 Ft. Woman. It was directed by Christopher Guest, with a script by Thirtysomething writer Joseph Dougherty. Daryl Hannah produced the film and starred in the title role.

In 1995, Fred Olen Ray produced a parody entitled Attack of the 60 Foot Centerfold, starring J.J. North and Tammy Parks. Beyond the basic premise, the plot has little in common with the original film, being concerned with the side effects of a beauty-enhancing formula on two ambitious female models. The film was farcical and made on an extremely low budget. The illusion of size difference was achieved using forced perspective, unlike the earlier films which used composite imaging.

In late 2011, Roger Corman produced a 3D film titled Attack of the 50 Foot Cheerleader, released on August 25, 2012. It was written by Mike MacLean (who also wrote Sharktopus for Corman) and was directed by Kevin O'Neill. The film stars Jena Sims (a former Miss Georgia Teen USA) in the title role as Cassie Stratford and Olivia Alexander, who co-plays Sims's rival, Brittany Andrews.

Home media
Attack of the 50 Foot Woman was released June 26, 2007 by Warner Bros. Home Video on region 1 DVD. It was also available in the Warner Bros. three-disc DVD box set Cult Camp Classics - Vol. 1: Sci-Fi Thrillers, which also includes other two cult classic sci-fi thrillers from Allied Artists Pictures, such as The Giant Behemoth (1959) and Queen of Outer Space (1958). An audio commentary track with co-star Yvette Vickers and Tom Weaver is also included. Although the DVDs are now officially out-of-print, on September 20, 2011, Warner Bros. added the film to its order-on-demand Warner Archive DVD-R collection; the content is the same as on the previous DVD releases. A Blu-ray will be released in December 2022 by Warner Archive Collection.

In popular culture

Television

1978 – Various animated television series have referenced the film, usually in episodes which involve a female character becoming giant-sized. For example, Challenge of the Super Friends from 1978 features the origins of superhero Apache Chief and supervillainess Giganta.
1989 – The Teenage Mutant Ninja Turtles episode "Attack of the 50 Foot Irma" has a similar plot, where April O'Neil's friend Irma is hit by a beam created by a meteorite crashing to Earth. She grows to a massive size and ends up being chased by authorities.
1997 – In the Johnny Bravo episode "Jumbo Johnny", a poster for the film was seen, with two men complaining about the movie.
1998 – Toonsylvania had a segment called "Attack of the Fifty Footed Woman".
1999 – Archie's Weird Mysteries episode "Attack of the 50 Ft. Veronica" has Veronica Lodge as a giantess.
2001 – In Smallville, the poster for the film is displayed in the offices of the school newspaper throughout the early series.
2007 – The Totally Spies! episode "Attack of the 50 Ft. Mandy" has Mandy as a giantess.
2009 – Phineas and Ferb has Candace become a giant in "Attack of the Fifty Foot Sister".
2019 – Episode 9 of the Netflix original series Raising Dion features the film's movie poster in Pat's condo after it is revealed that Pat shapeshifts into a 50-foot, human thunderstorm.
2020 – The twelfth episode of the first season of the animated series Harley Quinn features Poison Ivy making herself a giant to take on man-eating trees terrorizing the Gotham City Central Park and taking the pose featured on the film's poster.

Film
1968 – The film is featured in Joe Dante's movie mash-up The Movie Orgy.
1977 – Attack of the Fifty Foot Woman is playing in the drive-in theater in the 1977 film Ruby, featuring Piper Laurie.
1988 – In the film Saturday the 14th Strikes Back, Linda Baxter, played by Julianne McNamara, becomes a 50-foot woman and is stuck inside her house.
1994 – In Quentin Tarantino's film Pulp Fiction, the poster for the movie is seen in the club Vincent Vega and Mia Wallace dance in.
2009 – In the film Monsters vs. Aliens, Reese Witherspoon's character Ginormica (whose real name is Susan Murphy) was inspired by Attack of the 50 Foot Woman. Ginormica is 49 feet and 11 inches tall.

Books and comics
1990 – Terry Pratchett's Discworld novel Moving Pictures climaxes with a giant 50-foot woman carrying a screaming ape up a tall tower. This is also an inversion of the ending of King Kong, with flying wizards on broomsticks taking the place of Kong's pursuing biplanes.
2007 – Attack of the 50 Foot Woman was given an homage in Marvel Adventures: The Avengers #13, in a story titled "Attack of the Fifty Foot Girl!", spotlighting Avengers' member Giant-Girl. The cover of this issue was based upon the film's poster.
2009 – The Japanese manga series, Attack on Titan by Hajime Isayama was inspired by Attack of the 50 Foot Woman where the giants, known as "Titans", is based on. An anime television series debuted in 2013 was adapted from the manga.

Music and music videos
1981 –  The Tubes' album The Completion Backward Principle includes the song "Attack of the 50 Foot Woman".
1985 – The music video for Go West’s "Call Me" is an allusion to the film.
1991 –  The music video for Belinda Carlisle's song Do You Feel Like I Feel? was inspired by the film.
1998 –  The music video for Neil Finn's "She Will Have Her Way" is an extended allusion to the film and those that inspired it.
2019 –  Lana Del Rey’s music video for her cover of Sublime's "Doin' Time" is an allusion to the film.

See also
 List of American films of 1958
 The Amazing Colossal Man

References

External links
 
 
 
 
 Trailer of 
 Joe Dante on Attack of the 50 Foot Woman at Trailers From Hell

1958 films
1958 horror films
1950s monster movies
1950s science fiction horror films
Allied Artists films
American black-and-white films
American science fiction horror films
American monster movies
1950s English-language films
American films about revenge
Films directed by Nathan Juran
Films set in California
Films about adultery in the United States
Giant monster films
Films about giants
Films about size change
Films scored by Ronald Stein
1950s American films